Songgolmae (Korean:송골매) was a popular South Korean Hard rock band in the 1980s.The band is known for hit songs such as "accidental encounter(어쩌다 마주친 그대)" and "Let's gather!(모여라)".

History
The band was formed by Bae Cheol-soo in 1979. From their second album, Bae hired Gu Chang-mo as the main vocal of the band, however he quit being a vocal after the band's 4th album.

Electric shock incident
In March 22 of 1983,the leader of the band Bae Cheol-soo infamously received an electric shock while trying to grab the microphone while playing live on a program from the Korean Broadcasting System

Discography
Songolmae 1st album(1979.09.13) 'Jigu records'
Songolmae 2nd album(1982)
Songgolmae 3rd album (the moment I saw you)(1983)
Songgolmae 4th album(1984)
Songgolmae 5 (1985)
Songgolmae6(1986)

Reception
Kyunghyang Shinmun cited the band's 2nd album as one of the top 100 korean albums, praising that the album "completed 1980s korean rock music". During the band's high times, the band was the first korean band to win awards in best teen music and best rock group.

References

South Korean hard rock musical groups